The 115th Division was a military formation of the People's Volunteer Army (Chinese People's Volunteers (CPV) or Chinese Communist Forces (CCF)) during the Korean War with a standard strength of approximately 10,000 men. It was a component of the 39th Army, consisting of the 343rd, 344th, and 345th Regiments.

The 115th Division''' was one of the first CCF divisions to attack the UN forces as they approached the Yalu River.

It effectively reduced the 8th Cavalry Regiment of the 1st Cavalry Division to a combat ineffective unit, after inflicting severe loses on them at Unsan. In all, over eight hundred men of the 8th Cavalry were lost—almost one-third of the regiment’s strength.The enemy [Chinese] force that brought tragedy to the 8th Cavalry at Unsan was the CCF’s 116th Division. Elements of the 116th’s 347th Regiment were responsible for the roadblock south of Unsan. Also engaged in the Unsan action was the 115th Division.''

Current 
The unit appears to still be active with the 78th Group Army in the Northern Theater Command Ground Force, as the 115th Medium Combined Arms Brigade.

References 

Infantry brigades of the People's Liberation Army